Directorate Sports and Youth Welfare also known as Department of Sports & Youth Welfare is one of the department of state government of Madhya Pradesh, India, entitled for the development in the field of sports and youth welfare.

Objective & Functions of the Department

 Directorate Sports and Youth Welfare functions as the vital Department for the development of Backward Classes of the society and minority communities in the state of Madhya Pradesh.
 One of the major function and objective of this department is to frame the policies and laws for the development of the sports as well as the welfare of the youth.
 It also aims to control the poverty while providing employment to the people and implementing various welfare programmes and schemes to achieve the above objective.

Sports
The department organizes various inter-state, national and even international sports events, these are-

Indian originated games like Kho kho, Gulli Danda, Pittu Garam (Sitoliya) and Langdi are popular in the rural areas.

Coaches & trainers
 Cricket : Madan Lal was appointed as chief coach of the Madhya Pradesh Cricket Academy (MPCA) by the Directorate Sports and Youth Welfare.

References

External links
Directorate Sports and Youth Welfare Madhya Pradesh

Youth

India, Madhya Pradesh
Youth in India